A central conference is a collection of annual conferences of the United Methodist Church located outside the United States.

List of central conferences
There are seven central conferences in three continents:

Africa Central Conference
Congo Central Conference
West Africa Central Conference
Central and Southern Europe Central Conference
Germany Central Conference
Northern Europe Central Conference
Philippines Central Conference

United Methodist Church
Church organization
United Methodist Annual Conferences
United Methodism by region